Lochmaeocles alboplagiatus is a species of beetle in the family Cerambycidae. It was described by Dillon and Dillon in 1946. It is known from Trinidad and Panama.

References

alboplagiatus
Beetles described in 1946